A bazaar or souk (also transliterated as souq) is a marketplace consisting of multiple small stalls or shops, especially in the Middle East, the Balkans, North Africa and India. However, temporary open markets elsewhere, such as in the West, might also designate themselves as bazaars. The ones in the Middle East were traditionally located in vaulted or covered streets that had doors on each end and served as a city's central marketplace. Street markets are the European and North American equivalents.

The term bazaar originates from Persian, where it referred to a town's public market district. The term bazaar is sometimes also used to refer to the "network of merchants, bankers and craftsmen" who work in that area.
The term souk comes from Arabic and refers to marketplaces in the Middle East and North Africa.

Evidence for the existence of bazaars or souks dates to around 3000 BCE. Although the lack of archaeological evidence has limited detailed studies of the evolution of bazaars, indications suggest that they initially developed outside city walls where they were often associated with servicing the needs of caravanserai. As towns and cities became more populous, these bazaars moved into the city center and developed in a linear pattern along streets stretching from one city gate to another gate on the opposite side of the city. Souks became covered walkways. Over time, these bazaars formed a network of trading centres which allowed for the exchange of produce and information. The rise of large bazaars and stock trading centres in the Muslim world allowed the creation of new capitals and eventually new empires. New and wealthy cities such as Isfahan, Vijaynagara, Surat, Cairo, Agra, and Timbuktu were founded along trade routes and bazaars.

In the 18th and 19th centuries, Western interest in oriental culture led to the publication of many books about daily life in Middle Eastern countries. Souks, bazaars and the trappings of trade feature prominently in paintings and engravings, works of fiction and travel writing.

Shopping at a bazaar or market-place remains a central feature of daily life in many Middle-Eastern and South Asian cities and towns and the bazaar remains the "beating heart" of West Asian and South Asian life; in the Middle East, souks tend to be found in a city's medina (old quarter). Bazaars and souks are often important tourist attractions. A number of bazaar districts have been listed as World Heritage sites due to their historical and/or architectural significance.

Terminology by region

Bazaar 
In general a souk is synonymous with a bazaar or marketplace, and the term souk is used in Arabic-speaking countries.

The origin of the word bazaar comes from Persian bāzār, from Middle Persian wāzār, from Old Persian vāčar, from Proto-Indo-Iranian *wahā-čarana. The term, bazaar, spread from Persia into Arabia and ultimately throughout the Middle East.

The term bazaar is a common word in the Indian subcontinent: ; ; .

Differing meanings of "bazaar" 

In North America, the United Kingdom and some other European countries, the term charity bazaar can be used as a synonym for a "rummage sale", to describe charity fundraising events held by churches or other community organisations in which either donated used goods (such as books, clothes and household items) or new and handcrafted (or home-baked) goods are sold for low prices, as at a church or other organisation's Christmas bazaar, for example.

Although Turkey offers many famous markets known as "bazaars" in English, the Turkish word "pazar" refers to an outdoor market held at regular intervals, not a permanent structure containing shops. English place names usually translate "çarşı" (shopping district in a downtown or downtown itself) as "bazaar" when they refer to an area with covered streets or passages. For example, the Turkish name for the Grand Bazaar in Istanbul is "Kapalıçarşı" (gated shopping area), while the Spice Bazaar is the "Mısır Çarşısı" (Egyptian shopping area).

In Czech, the word "bazar" means second-hand shop. "Autobazar" is a shop which purchases and sells pre-owned cars.

Variations 

In Indonesian, the word pasar means "market." The capital of Bali province, in Indonesia, is Denpasar, which means "north market."

Souk 

The Arabic word is a loan from Aramaic "šūqā" ("street, market"), itself a loanword from the Akkadian "sūqu" ("street"). The spelling souk entered European languages likely through French during the French occupation of the Arab countries Morocco, Algeria, and Tunisia in the 19th and 20th centuries. Thus, the word "souk" mostly refers to Arabic and North African traditional markets. Other spellings of this word involving the letter "Q" (sooq, souq, and so'oq) were likely developed using English and thus refer to Western Asian or Arab traditional markets, as there were several British colonies there during the 19th and 20th centuries.

In Modern Standard Arabic the term al-sooq refers to markets in both the physical sense and the abstract economic sense (e.g., an Arabic-speaker would speak of the sooq in the old city as well as the sooq for oil, and would call the concept of the free market السوق الحرّ as-sūq al-ḥurr).

Variations on "souk" 

In northern Morocco, the Spanish corruption socco is often used as in the Grand Socco and Petit Socco of Tangiers.

In the Indian subcontinent the 'chowk' is often used to name a place with four-way crossroad, and comes from Sanskrit चतवार, meaning four. In Western Asia(Middle east), this term is used generally to designate the market, but may also be used in Western cities, particularly those with a Muslim community.

In Malta, the terms suq and sometimes monti are used for a marketplace.

In the United States, especially in Southern California and Nevada, an indoor swap meet is a type of bazaar, i.e. a permanent, indoor shopping center open during normal retail hours, with fixed "booths" or counters for the vendors.

History

Origins in Antiquity 

Historical records document the concept of a bazaar existing in Iran as early as 3000 BC, where some large cities contained districts dedicated to trade and commerce. Archeological data also suggests the existence of market districts in ancient Mesopotamia. Markets centers must have existed in Egypt to conduct international trade, but no archeological evidence for them has been found. In Achaemenid Persia (550-330 BCE), documents indicate that crafts were sold in markets close to Persepolis. A network of bazaars had sprung up alongside ancient caravan trade routes. Bazaars located along these trade routes, formed networks, linking major cities with each other and in which goods, culture, people and information could be exchanged. Sources from around the same era also indicate that ancient Greeks regulated trade in areas at the center of their cities around stoa buildings. The ideas of Greek city planning were spread to the Middle East during the Seleucid period, following the conquests of Alexander the Great.

The Greek historian, Herodotus, noted that in Egypt, roles were reversed compared with other cultures and Egyptian women frequented the market and carried on trade, while the men remain at home weaving cloth. He also described The Babylonian Marriage Market.

Sassanid rule in Iran was an important period for the development of urbanization and commerce. In Sassanid Iran the bazaar was usually the heart of a town or city, where it spread outwards and affected the development of other neighbourhoods. The bazaar usually contained, or was adjoined by, an open-air plaza that served as a forum of socio-economic activity.

Historically, souks were also held outside cities at locations where incoming caravans stopped and merchants displayed their goods for sale. Souks were established at caravanserai, places where a caravan or caravans arrived and remained for rest and refreshments. Since this might be infrequent, souks often extended beyond buying and selling goods to include major festivals involving various cultural and social activities. Any souk may serve a social function as being a place for people to meet in, in addition to its commercial function.

Islamic period 

During the Islamic period, bazaars in Iran developed along the same lines as those of the Sassanid period.  Bazaars were typically situated in close proximity to ruling palaces, citadels or mosques, not only because the city afforded traders some protection, but also because palaces and cities generated substantial demand for goods and services.

From around the 10th century, as major cities increased in size, the souk or marketplace shifted to the center of urban cities where it spread out along the city streets, typically in a linear pattern. Around this time, permanent souks also became covered marketplaces.

City bazaars occupied a series of alleys along the length of the city, typically stretching from one city gate to a different gate on the other side of the city. The Bazaar of Tabriz, for example, stretches along 1.5 kilometres of street and is the longest vaulted bazaar in the world. Moosavi argues that the Middle-Eastern bazaar evolved in a linear pattern, whereas the market places of the West were more centralised.

In pre-Islamic Arabia, two types of bazaar existed: permanent urban markets and temporary seasonal markets. The temporary seasonal markets were held at specific times of the year and became associated with particular types of produce. Suq Hijr in Bahrain was noted for its dates while Suq 'Adan was known for its spices and perfumes. In spite of the centrality of the Middle East in the history of bazaars, relatively little is known due to the lack of archaeological evidence. However, documentary sources point to permanent marketplaces in cities from as early as 550 BCE.

Nejad has made a detailed study of early bazaars in Iran and identifies two distinct types, based on their place within the economy, namely:

 Commercial bazaars (or retail bazaars): emerged as part of an urban economy not based on a merchant system
 Socio-commercial bazaars: formed in economies based on a merchant system, socio-economic bazaars are situated on major trade routes and are well integrated into the city's structural and spatial systems

21st century 

In the Middle East, the bazaar is considered to be "the beating heart of the city and a symbol of Islamic architecture and culture of high significance." Today, bazaars are popular sites for tourists and some of these ancient bazaars have been listed as world heritage sites or national monuments on the basis of their historical, cultural or architectural value.

The Medina of Fez, Morocco, with its labyrinthine covered market streets was listed as a UNESCO World Heritage Site in 1981. Al-Madina Souq is part of the ancient city of Aleppo in Syria, another UNESCO World Heritage Site since 1986. The Bazaar complex at Tabriz, Iran was listed in 2010 and Kemeraltı Bazaar of İzmir in 2020. The Bazaar of Qaisiyariye in Lar, Iran is on the tentative list of UNESCO World Heritage Sites.

Types

Seasonal 

A temporary, seasonal souk is held at a set time that might be yearly, monthly or weekly.  The oldest souks were set up annually, and were typically general festivals held outside cities.  For example, Souk Ukadh was held yearly in pre-Islamic times in an area between Mecca and Ta’if during the sacred month of Dhu al-Qi'dah.  While a busy market, it was more famous for its poetry competitions, judged by prominent poets such as Al-Khansa and Al-Nabigha.  An example of an Islamic annual souk is Al Mirbid just outside Basra, also famed for its poetry competitions in addition to its storytelling activities. Temporary souks tended to become known for specific types of produce. For example, Suq Hijr in Bahrain was noted for its dates while Suq 'Adan was known for its spices and perfumes. Political, economic and social changes have left only the small seasonal souks outside villages and small towns, primarily selling livestock and agricultural products.

Weekly markets have continued to function throughout the Arab world. Most of them are named from the day of the week on which they are held.  They usually have open spaces specifically designated for their use inside cities. Examples of surviving markets are the Wednesday Market in Amman that specializes in the sale of used products, the Ghazl market held every Friday in Baghdad specializing in pets; the Fina’ Market in Marrakech offers performance acts such as singing, music, acrobats and circus activities.

In tribal areas, where seasonal souks operated, neutrality from tribal conflicts was usually declared for the period of operation of a souk to permit the unhampered exchange of surplus goods. Some of the seasonal markets were held at specific times of the year and became associated with particular types of produce such as Suq Hijr in Bahrain, noted for its dates while Suq 'Adan was known for its spices and perfumes. In spite of the centrality of the Middle Eastern market place, relatively little is known due to the lack of archaeological evidence.

Permanent 

Permanent souks are more commonly occurring, but less renowned as they focus on commercial activity, and not entertainment. Until the Umayyad era, permanent souks were merely an open space where merchants would bring in their movable stalls during the day and remove them at night; no one had a right to specific pitch and it was usually first-come first-served.  During the Umayyad era the governments started leasing, and then selling, sites to merchants.  Merchants then built shops on their sites to store their goods at night.  Finally, the area comprising a souk might be roofed over.  With its long and narrow alleys, al-Madina Souk is the largest covered historic market in the world, with an approximate length of 13 kilometers. Al-Madina Souk is part of the Ancient City of Aleppo, a UNESCO World Heritage Site since 1986 in Syria.

Organization 

Gharipour has pointed out that in spite of the centrality of souks and bazaars in Middle Eastern history, relatively little is known due to the lack of archaeological evidence. Souks are traditionally divided into specialized sections dealing in specific types of product, in the case of permanent souks each usually housed in a few narrow streets and named after the product it specializes in such as the gold souk, the fabric souk, the spice souk, the leather souk, the copy souk (for books), etc.  This promotes competition among sellers and helps buyers easily compare prices.

At the same time the whole assembly is collectively called a souk.  Some of the prominent examples are Souk Al-Melh in Sana'a, Manama Souk in Bahrain, Bizouriyya Souk in Damascus, Saray Souk in Baghdad, Khan Al-Zeit in Jerusalem, and Zanqat Al-Niswaan in Alexandria.

Though each neighbourhood within the city would have a local Souk selling food and other essentials, the main souk was one of the central structures of a large city, selling durable goods, luxuries and providing services such as money exchange. Workshops where goods for sale are produced (in the case of a merchant selling locally-made products) are typically located away from the souk itself. The souk was a level of municipal administration. The Muhtasib was responsible for supervising business practices and collecting taxes for a given souk while the Arif are the overseers for a specific trade.

Shopping at a souk or market place is part of daily life throughout much of the Middle East. Prices are commonly set by bargaining, also known as haggling, between buyers and sellers.

In art and literature – Orientalism 

During the 18th and 19th centuries, Europeans conquered and excavated parts of North Africa and the Levant. These regions now make up what is called the Middle East, but in the past were known as the Orient. Europeans sharply divided peoples into two broad groups – the European West and the East or Orient; us and the other. Europeans often saw Orientals as the opposite of Western civilization; the peoples could be threatening- they were "despotic, static and irrational whereas Europe was viewed as democratic, dynamic and rational." At the same time, the Orient was seen as exotic, mysterious, a place of fables and beauty. This fascination with the other gave rise to a genre of painting known as Orientalism. A proliferation of both Oriental fiction and travel writing occurred during the early modern period.

Subject matter 

Many of these works were lavishly illustrated with engravings of every day scenes of Oriental lifestyles, including scenes of market places and market trade. Artists focused on the exotic beauty of the land – the markets, caravans and snake charmers. Islamic architecture also became favorite subject matter. Some of these works were propaganda designed to justify European imperialism in the East, however many artists relied heavily on their everyday experiences for inspiration in their artworks. For example, Charles D'Oyly, who was born in India, published the Antiquities of Dacca featuring a series of 15 engraved plates of Dacca [now Dhaka, Bangladesh] featuring scenes of markets, commerce, buildings and streetscapes. European society generally frowned on nude painting – but harems, concubines and slave markets, presented as quasi-documentary works, satisfied European desires for pornographic art. The Oriental female wearing a veil was a particularly tempting subject because she was hidden from view, adding to her mysterious allure.

Notable Orientalist artists 

Notable artists in the Orientalist genre include: Jean-Léon Gérôme Delacroix (1824–1904), Alexandre-Gabriel Decamps (1803–1860), Frederic Leighton (1830-1896), Eugène Alexis Girardet 1853-1907 and William Holman Hunt (1827–1910) who all found inspiration in Oriental street scenes, trading and commerce. French painter Jean-Étienne Liotard visited Istanbul in the 17th century and painted pastels of Turkish domestic scenes. British painter John Frederick Lewis who lived for several years in a traditional mansion in Cairo, painted highly detailed works showing realistic genre scenes of Middle Eastern life. Edwin Lord Weeks was a notable American example of a 19th-century artist and author in the Orientalism genre. His parents were wealthy tea and spice merchants who were able to fund his travels and interest in painting. In 1895 Weeks wrote and illustrated a book of travels titled From the Black Sea through Persia and India. Other notable painters in the Orientalist genre who included scenes of street life and market-based trade in their work are Jean-Léon Gérôme Delacroix (1824–1904), Alexandre-Gabriel Decamps (1803–1860), Frederic Leighton (1830–1896), Eugène Alexis Girardet 1853–1907 and William Holman Hunt (1827–1910), who all found inspiration in Oriental street scenes, trading and commerce.

Orientalist literature 

A proliferation of both Oriental fiction and travel writing occurred during the early modern period.

Many English visitors to the Orient wrote narratives around their travels. British Romantic literature in the Orientalism tradition has its origins in the early eighteenth century, with the first translations of The Arabian Nights (translated into English from the French in 1705–08). The popularity of this work inspired authors to develop a new genre, the Oriental tale. Samuel Johnson's History of Rasselas, Prince of Abyssinia, (1759) is mid-century example of the genre. Byron's Oriental Tales, is another example of the Romantic Orientalism genre.

Although these works were purportedly non-fiction, they were notoriously unreliable. Many of these accounts provided detailed descriptions of market places, trading and commerce. Examples of travel writing include: Les Mysteres de L'Egypte Devoiles by Olympe Audouard published in 1865<ref>Audouard, O. (de Jouval), Les Mystères de l'Égypte Dévoilés, (French Edition) (originally published in 1865), Elibron Classics, 2006</ref> and Jacques Majorelle's Road Trip Diary of a Painter in the Atlas and the Anti-Atlas published in 1922

 Gallery of paintings and watercolours 

 Gallery of photographs 

 List of bazaars and souks 

 See also 

 List of Orientalist artists

 Types of markets, bazaars and souks
 Bazaari
 Bedesten (also known as bezistan, bezisten, bedesten) refers to a covered bazaar and an open bazaar in the Balkans.
 Haat bazaar – (also known as a hat) an open air bazaar or market in South Asia.
 Landa bazaar – a terminal market or market for second hand goods (South Asia), such as Medina quarter.
 Meena Bazaar – a bazaar that raises money for non-profit organisations.
 Pasar malam – a night market in Malaysia, Indonesia and Singapore that opens in the evening, typically held in the street in residential neighbourhoods.
 Pasar pagi – a morning market, typically a wet market that trades from dawn until midday, found in Malaysia, Indonesia and Singapore. A Wet market sells fresh meat, and produce. See also Dry goods.

 Markets and retail in general
 Arcade – a covered passageway with stores along one or both sides.
 History of marketing
 Marketplace
 Merchant
 Peddler
 Retail
 Shopping mall
 Shōtengai - a style of Japanese commercial district, typically in the form of a local market street that is closed to vehicular traffic.

 References 

 Further reading 

 The Persian Bazaar: Veiled Space of Desire (Mage Publications) by Mehdi Khansari
 The Morphology of the Persian Bazaar (Agah Publications) by Azita Rajabi.
 

 External links 

Bazaar – Merriam-Webster''
 Iran Chamber Society on Architecture of the Bazaar at Isfahan (archived 30 December 2007)
 

 
Islamic culture
Persian words and phrases
Iranian folklore
Shopping (activity)